Nandita B. Basu is a scientist and professor at the University of Waterloo. Her research is centered on anthropogenic effects on water availability and quality via changes in land use and climate. Basu is recognized for her work on discovering the impact of nutrient legacies and proposed solutions to improving water quality of lakes and coastal zones. She is a member of Robert E. Horton Medal Committee.

Early life and education 

Basu earned her Bachelor of Civil Engineering from Jadavpur University in 1997, Master of Technology in Environmental technology from the Indian Institute of Technology in 2001, and PhD in Civil Engineering from Purdue University in 2006.

Career and research 
Basu is currently an associate professor at the University of Waterloo in Waterloo, Ontario, Canada. Previous to this position, Basu taught undergraduate courses on Principles in Environmental Engineering and graduate-level courses on Groundwater and Water Resources Sustainability at the University of Iowa. Basu also runs the Basu Lab at the University of Waterloo where she and her diverse research group discover innovative solutions to water sustainability challenges by studying patterns in landscape, hydrology, and biochemistry and the role humans play in changing such patterns.

Basu is known for her research on how through altered land use and changing climate humans impact water availability and quality, specifically through agricultural practices such as the use of fertilizers and intensive livestock production. Much of her work is centered on finding solutions to the water sustainability challenges these impacts pose. Basu's expertise lies specifically in: contaminant fate and transport, watershed biogeochemistry, ecosystem restoration, human impacts on the environment, and water resources sustainability.  She is recognized for her work on discovering the impacts of nutrient legacies on water quality and her proposed solutions to improving the  water quality of lakes and coastal zones.

Awards and honors 
Basu is  a member of The Royal Society of Canada's College of New Scholar's, Artists and Scientists as of September 2019. The grants and fellowships she has been awarded include:

 2014 Ontario Early Researcher Award
 2010 CUAHSI Young Career Fellowship
 2009 Gordon Research Conference Travel Award
 2005-06 Ludwig Kruhe Fellowship at Purdue University
 2005 Bossler Environmental Grant at Purdue University
 2003 Joseph P. Chu Fellowship at Purdue University
 2001-2003 Andrews Fellowship at Purdue University.

Publications 
Select publications from Basu and her group are below. For a more complete list of publications, see Basu's Google Scholar profile

 The future of hydrology: An evolving science for a changing world. 2010. Water Resources Research 
 Nutrient loads exported from managed catchments reveal emergent biogeochemical stationarity. 2012. Geophysical Research Letters. 
 Geographically isolated wetlands are important biogeochemical reactors on the landscape. 2015 Bioscience

Public engagement 
"Geographically isolated wetlands are important biogeochemical reactors to the landscape", an article Basu co-authored, gains relevance in a time in which the Trump administration is rolling back clean water protections set in place during the Obama-era. These protections previously placed limits on chemicals that were allowed to be used near streams, wetlands, and other bodies of water. Without these protections a permit will no longer be necessary to dispose of potentially harmful chemicals into streams and wetlands. The authors concluded that despite the lack of connection to surface water or adjacency to jurisdictional waters that other wetlands have, geographically isolated wetlands are essential to biogeochemical processing of landscapes. Therefore, they are just as essential to maintaining the health of jurisdictional waters and aquatic systems and should have the same protections as those protected by the law. Trump's rollbacks would directly impact these wetlands that Basu and her associates argue are essential to the health of our jurisdictional waters and aquatic systems as well as numerous other streams and bodies of water.

References 

Living people
Year of birth missing (living people)
Krannert School of Management alumni
Academic staff of the University of Waterloo
Jadavpur University alumni
IIT Kanpur alumni
Women scientists from West Bengal
Women hydrologists